Amanda Bobby Brundage (née Cooper, born October 22, 1991) is an American professional mixed martial artist who competed in the Strawweight division of the Invicta Fighting Championships (Invicta FC) and Ultimate Fighting Championship (UFC). She currently competes in Lights Out Championship.

Mixed martial arts career

King of the Cage
Cooper made her professional MMA debut with the King of the Cage promotion in February 2014. She defeated Brittany Dugas by armbar submission in the second round.

Invicta FC
Cooper next fought for Invicta FC in September 2015. She lost to Aspen Ladd at Invicta 14.

The Ultimate Fighter
In April 2016, it was announced that Cooper would be a contestant on The Ultimate Fighter: Team Joanna vs. Team Cláudia. She defeated  Mellony Geugjes in the opening qualifying round to gain entry into the house.

At The Ultimate Fighter: Team Joanna vs. Team Cláudia finale, she lost to Tatiana Suarez in the women's strawweight final.

Ultimate Fighting Championship
Cooper faced Anna Elmose at UFC Fight Night 99. She won the fight via unanimous decision.

Cooper faced TUF 20 contestant Angela Magaña at UFC 218 on December 2, 2017. She won the fight by TKO in the second round, giving Cooper her first win via TKO.

Cooper faced Mackenzie Dern on May 12, 2018 at UFC 224. At the weigh-ins, Dern weighed in at 123 pounds, 7 pounds over the strawweight non-title fight upper limit of 116 pounds. As a result, the bout proceeded at catchweight and Dern was fined 30% of her purse. Cooper lost the bout via submission in the first round.

In what marked the last fight of her contract, Cooper faced Ashley Yoder on November 10, 2018 UFC Fight Night 139.  She lost the fight via a split decision. UFC opted not to renew her contract after the fight.

Post-UFC career 
On July 17, 2019, it was reported that Cooper was signed by Invicta Fighting Championships.

Cooper defeated Jamie Milanowski via first-round TKO at Lights Out Championship 5 on September 7, 2019

Personal life
Amanda is married to Cody Brundage, a fellow mixed martial artist with whom she has a daughter, Kingsley.

Mixed martial arts record

|-
|Win
|align=center|4–5
|Jamie Milanowski 
|TKO (elbows)
|Lights Out Championship 5  
|
|align=center|1
|align=center|4:16
|Grand Rapids, Michigan, United States
|
|-
|Loss
|align=center|3–5
|Ashley Yoder
|Decision (split)
|UFC Fight Night: The Korean Zombie vs. Rodríguez 
|
|align=center|3
|align=center|5:00
|Denver, Colorado, United States
|
|- 
|Loss
|align=center|3–4
|Mackenzie Dern
|Submission (rear-naked choke)
|UFC 224
|
|align=center|1
|align=center|2:27
|Rio de Janeiro, Brazil
|
|-
|Win
|align=center|3–3
|Angela Magaña
|TKO (punches)
|UFC 218
|
|align=center|2
|align=center|4:32
|Detroit, Michigan, United States
|
|-
|Loss
|align=center|2–3
|Cynthia Calvillo
|Submission (rear-naked choke)
|UFC 209
|
|align=center|1
|align=center|3:19
|Las Vegas, Nevada, United States
|
|-
|Win
|align=center|2–2
|Anna Elmose
|Decision (unanimous)
|UFC Fight Night: Mousasi vs. Hall 2
|
|align=center|3
|align=center|5:00
|Belfast, Northern Ireland
|
|-
|Loss
|align=center|1–2
|Tatiana Suarez
|Submission (D'Arce choke)
|The Ultimate Fighter: Team Joanna vs. Team Cláudia Finale
|
|align=center|1
|align=center|3:43
|Las Vegas, Nevada, United States
|
|-
| Loss
| align=center| 1–1
| Aspen Ladd
| Submission (armbar)
| Invicta FC 14: Evinger vs. Kianzad
| 
| align=center| 2
| align=center| 4:42
| Kansas City, Missouri, United States
|
|-
| Win
| align=center| 1–0
| Brittany Dugas
| Submission (armbar)
| KOTC: Unrestricted
| 
| align=center| 2
| align=center| 4:59
| Walker, Minnesota, United States
| 
|-

References

External links
 
 

1991 births
American female mixed martial artists
Strawweight mixed martial artists
Living people
Flyweight mixed martial artists
Mixed martial artists utilizing boxing
Mixed martial artists utilizing Brazilian jiu-jitsu
Mixed martial artists from Michigan
American women boxers
Boxers from Michigan
American practitioners of Brazilian jiu-jitsu
Female Brazilian jiu-jitsu practitioners
Ultimate Fighting Championship female fighters
People from Bath, Michigan
21st-century American women